Altes Schauspielhausgebäude Düsseldorf  is a theatre in Düsseldorf, North Rhine-Westphalia, Germany, founded on June 16, 1904.

References

Theatres in Düsseldorf